Carolyn Russell (born May 18, 1974 in Montreal, Quebec) is a retired Canadian professional female squash player. She reached a career-high world ranking of World No. 40 in March 2007 after having joined the Women's International Squash Players Association (WISPA) in 2001.

Russell won the Canadian Championships in 2006, was 3rd in 2007, and 4th in 2005 and 2009.

Russell represented Canada five times at the world team championships helping Canada to four top 10 finishes.

Personal
Russell currently resides in Vancouver, B.C. and is a project director at the Multi Sport Centre of Excellence Foundation in Burnaby, B.C. She holds a M.S. in engineering from Queen's University and an MBA degree from the University of Toronto.

References

External links 
 

1974 births
Living people
Anglophone Quebec people
Canadian female squash players
Sportspeople from Montreal
Squash players at the 2007 Pan American Games
Pan American Games gold medalists for Canada
Pan American Games silver medalists for Canada
Pan American Games medalists in squash
Squash players at the 2003 Pan American Games
Medalists at the 2003 Pan American Games
Medalists at the 2007 Pan American Games